Sayak Airport (Surigaonon: Tugpahanan nan Sayak) , commonly known as Siargao Airport, is the main airport serving Siargao Island located in Del Carmen, Surigao del Norte, Philippines. The airport is designated as a Class 2 principal (minor domestic) airport by the Civil Aviation Authority of the Philippines (CAAP).

History
Siargao Airport was built in 1963 by President Diosdado Macapagal. In 2008, President Gloria Arroyo initiated the Super Regions Program to improve economic activity through infrastructure projects. The original airport could accommodate 19-seater planes from Cebu. The airport was renovated and upgraded with the current  runway which accommodates larger aircraft carrying more than 70 passengers.

Airlines and destinations

Incidents and accidents
On February 27, 2018, a SkyJet Airlines British Aerospace 146 overshot the runway. All 73 passengers and four crew members evacuated the aircraft unharmed. The cause of the incident is currently under investigation, but the CAAP is noting a possible bird strike after one of the passengers reported that the pilot attempted to dodge a passing eagle.

See also
List of airports in the Philippines

References

External links
 Sayak Airport, Siargao Islands

Airports in the Philippines
Buildings and structures in Surigao del Norte
Transportation in Mindanao